The Starr Foundation was established in 1955 by Cornelius Vander Starr, an insurance entrepreneur who founded C.V. Starr & Co. and other companies later combined by his successor, Maurice R. Greenberg, into what became the American International Group.  Starr, a pioneer of globalization, set up his first insurance venture in Shanghai in 1919. Upon his death in 1968 his estate was passed on to the foundation. Today, it gives between US$100 million and $200 million each year to charities and causes globally.

The foundation, once one of the largest in the country with an endowment of some $6 billion in 2000, has disbursed over $3.8 billion since its founding.  As of 2019, it had assets of $1.5 billion. It specializes in Asian arts and cultural philanthropy, but also makes grants in other areas, including education, medicine and healthcare, and public policy.

The foundation is no longer affiliated with AIG.

See also
 List of grants by the Starr Foundation
 List of wealthiest foundations
 Florence A. Davis, Foundation President

References

External links
 The Starr Foundation starrfoundation.org

Foundations based in the United States
Organizations based in New York City
Organizations established in 1955
1955 establishments in the United States